The China Railways ST2 class steam locomotive was a class of 2-10-2 steam locomotives operated by the China Railway, built by the Krupp in Germany in 1935 for the privately owned Jinpu Railway in China. After 1938 they were operated by the North China Transportation Company, which designated them サタニ (Satani) class; after 1949 they were operated by the China Railway as class ST2, with the last of them retired by 1990. ST2-22 remains preserved at the Shenyang Railway Museum.

See also
DRG Class 45

References

2-10-2 locomotives
Krupp locomotives
Railway locomotives introduced in 1935
Steam locomotives of China
Freight locomotives